CYGO may refer to:
 Gods Lake Narrows Airport, ICAO airport code CYGO, Manitoba, Canada
 CYGO (rapper), Belarusian rapper and songwriter